Eitzinger is a German surname, popular in Austria. Notable people with the surname include:

 Philipp Eitzinger (born 1990), Austrian motorcycle racer
 Rainer Eitzinger (born 1983), Austrian tennis player

References

German-language surnames